Mount Wutai, also known by its Chinese name Wutaishan and as  is a sacred Buddhist site at the headwaters of the Qingshui in Shanxi Province, China. Its central area is surrounded by a cluster of flat-topped peaks roughly corresponding to the cardinal directions. The north peak (Beitai Ding or Yedou Feng) is the highest and is also the highest point in northern China.

As host to over 53 sacred monasteries, Mount Wutai is home to many of China's most important monasteries and temples.  It was inscribed as a UNESCO World Heritage Site in 2009 and named a AAAAA tourist attraction by China's National Tourism Administration in 2007.

Significance
Mount Wutai is one of the Four Sacred Mountains in Chinese Buddhism. Each of the mountains is viewed as the bodhimaṇḍa of one of the four great bodhisattvas. Wǔtái is the home of the Bodhisattva of wisdom, Mañjuśrī or "" in Chinese. Mañjuśrī has been associated with Mount Wutai since ancient times. Paul Williams writes:

Wutai was the first of the mountains to be identified and is often referred to as "first among the four great mountains". It was identified on the basis of a passage in the Avataṃsaka Sūtra, which describes the abodes of many bodhisattvas. In this chapter, Mañjuśrī is said to reside on a "clear cold mountain" in the northeast. This served as charter for the mountain's identity and its alternate name "Clear Cool Mountain".

The bodhisattva is believed to frequently appear on the mountain, taking the form of ordinary pilgrims, monks, or most often unusual five-colored clouds.

Reflecting regional rivalries between Buddhist centers, 9th-century Chan Buddhism master Linji Yixuan criticized the prominence of Wutai in Tang dynasty China. According to the posthumously compiled Línjì yǔlù, Linji Yixuan once said, “There‘s a bunch of students who seek Mañjuśrī on Mount Wutai. Wrong from the start! There‘s no Mañjuśrī on Mount Wutai.” His campaign was however not successful, and even after the Tang era Mount Wutai “continued to thrive as perhaps the single most famous Buddhist sacred site in China.”

Mount Wutai has an enduring relationship with Tibetan Buddhism. It was historically sacred to Taoist pilgrims on the Silk Road in the 10th century as well.

Mount Wutai is home to some of the oldest wooden buildings in China that have survived since the era of the Tang Dynasty (618–907). This includes the main hall of Nanchan Temple and the East Hall of Foguang Temple, built in 782 and 857, respectively. They were discovered in 1937 and 1938 by a team of architectural historians including the prominent early 20th-century historian Liang Sicheng. The architectural designs of these buildings have since been studied by leading sinologists and experts in traditional Chinese architecture, such as Nancy Steinhardt. Steinhardt classified these buildings according to the hall types featured in the Yingzao Fashi Chinese building manual written in the 12th century.

In 2008, there were complaints from local residents that, in preparation for Mount Wutai's bid to become a UNESCO World Heritage Site, they were forced from their homes and relocated away from their livelihoods.

Major temples
Nanchan Temple  is a large temple in Mount Wǔtái, first built in the Yuan Dynasty. The whole temple comprises seven terraces, divided into three parts. The lower three terraces are named Jile Temple; the middle terrace is called Shande Hall; the upper three terraces are named Youguo Temple. Other major temples include Xiantong Temple, Tayuan Temple and Pusading Temple.

Other important temples inside Mount Wutai include Shouning Temple, Bishan Temple, Puhua Temple, Dailuo Ding, Qixian Temple, Shifang Tang, Shuxiang Temple, Guangzong Temple, Youguo Temple, Guanyin Dong, Longhua Temple, Luomuhou Temple, Jinge Temple, Zhanshan Temple, Wanfo Ge, Guanhai Temple, Zhulin Temple, Jifu Temple, and Gufo Temple.

Outer Mount Wutai temples include Yanqing Temple, Nanchan Temple, Mimi Temple, Foguang Temple, Yanshan Temple, Zunsheng Temple, and Guangji Temple. A giant statue of Maha Manjushree was presented to the Buddhists of China by foreign minister of Nepal Ramesh Nath Pandey in 2005.

Transportation
The Wutaishan Airport in nearby Dingxiang County opened in December 2015.

Climate 

Mount Wutai has a subarctic climate (Köppen climate classification Dwc).

Gallery

See also
 List of AAAAA-rated tourist attractions of the People's Republic of China

References

Further reading
China's Holy Mountain: An Illustrated Journey into the Heart of Buddhism by Christoph Baumer. I.B. Tauris, London 2011. .

http://www.thlib.org/collections/texts/jiats/#!jiats=/06/elverskog/b2/

External links

 International Network of Geoparks
 List of Geoparks
 Photos from inside the temples at WuTaiShan

 
AAAAA-rated tourist attractions
Geoparks in China
Highest points of Chinese provinces
Wutai
National parks of China
Wutai
Tourist attractions in Shanxi
World Heritage Sites in China
Major National Historical and Cultural Sites in Shanxi
Buddhist sites in China
Mañjuśrī
Tibetan Buddhist places
Wutai